Grave Pleasures is a Finnish post-punk band from Helsinki. Formed in 2010, Grave Pleasure's previous incarnation, Beastmilk, released a demo followed by an EP, and later debut full-length Climax. Members Mat McNerney and Valtteri Arino continued the band in 2015 as Grave Pleasures, following Johan Snell and Paile's departure with the group. With new members, Grave Pleasures released Dreamcrash months later.

History

Formation as Beastmilk
Beastmilk was founded in 2010 by Mat McNerney, Johan Snell, Valtteri Arino and Paile in Helsinki, Finland. The band name came about because McNerney and Snell read White Stains by Aleister Crowley, and wanted "to have a dialogue about what it means to be a man and go through all these male emotions... It was sort of a conversation on what is your father’s milk, what is your mother’s milk and so on." It also came out of Snell's interest in liquids and how it affects society. The band later self-released a demo, White Stains on Black Tape, in the same year. The demo was well received including from musicians Fenriz of Darkthrone and Nate Newton of Converge.

On April 2, 2012, Beastmilk released an EP Use Your Deluge under Finnish label Svart Records. In June 2013, the band went to Salem, Massachusetts to record their debut full-length Climax, with Converge guitarist Kurt Ballou at his own recording studio GodCity Studio. Climax was released on November 29, 2013, under the Magic Bullet Records label.

Name change with new lineup 
Following the positive reception of Climax, Sony was interested in offering Beastmilk to join the label under Columbia Records. At the time of the offer, there were tensions between Snell and the rest of Beastmilk. Former The Oath guitarist Linnea Olsson joined Beastmilk in August 2015, shortly after the departure of drummer Paile. Linnea Olsson toured with the band as their new second guitarist in October 2015 when they joined In Solitude. In 2015 the group moved on without Snell, leaving McNerney and Arino the original members of the band. McNerney and Arino took the name Grave Pleasures. The band recruited former In Solitude member Uno Bruniusson on drums and Oranssi Pazuzu's Juho Vanhanen as session guitarist. As a five piece, including Vanhanen, Grave Pleasures recorded Dreamcrash in May 2015 with producer Tom Dalgety. Dreamcrash released on September 4, 2015, in Finland, Germany, Switzerland and Austria and October 2 in the United Kingdom and France by Columbia. Metal Blade Records handled the North American release of Dreamcrash for its November 13, 2015 release.

Members 
 Mat "Kvohst" McNerney - Vocals
 Valtteri Arino - Bass
 Juho Vanhanen - Guitars
 Aleksi Kiiskilä - Guitars
 Rainer Tuomikanto - Drums

Past members 
 Johan "Goatspeed" Snell - Guitars
 Dimitri Paile - Drums
 Linnea Olsson - Guitars
 Uno Bruniusson - Drums

Discography 
 Climax (2013)
 Dreamcrash (2015)
 Funeral Party (2017; EP)
 Motherblood (2017)

References

External links 
 Grave Pleasures Official Website

Musical groups established in 2010
Finnish rock music groups
Finnish post-punk music groups